Chitinimonas koreensis is a Gram-negative, catalase- and oxidase-positive motile bacterium with a single flagellum of the genus Chitinimonas and the family Burkholderiaceae which was isolated from greenhouse soil in Korea.

References

External links
Type strain of Chitinimonas koreensis at BacDive -  the Bacterial Diversity Metadatabase

Burkholderiaceae
Bacteria described in 2006